The Progressive Party of Aotearoa New Zealand (PPANZ) is an unregistered political party in New Zealand. The party supports the Progressive Utilization Theory of Prabhat Ranjan Sarkar, including economic democracy and the transformation of large businesses into cooperatives. It is led by Bruce Dyer.

2020 election
As an unregistered party, PPANZ was unable to contest the party vote. It stood two candidates in the Nelson and Mana electorates in the 2020 New Zealand general election. Neither candidate was successful; leader Bruce Dyer received 50 electorate votes, or 0.1% of the vote.

References

External links
 Official website

2020 establishments in New Zealand
Political parties established in 2020
Cooperative parties
Prabhat Ranjan Sarkar